Mary Carmella Riddell (born 19 April 1952) is a British journalist. She has been a newspaper columnist for The Daily Telegraph, and served as the newspaper's assistant editor.

Early life
Riddell was born in Grimsby and attended Boston High School, a girls' grammar school. She studied Modern Languages at the University of Nottingham. She grew up in a Catholic family with sisters Sheila and Maddi and brother John. Her sister is Professor Sheila Riddell (born 2 December 1953), an academic at the University of Edinburgh and Director of the Centre for Research in Education Inclusion and Diversity (CREID), who is married to Professor Ken Sorbie, Professor of Petroleum Engineering at Heriot-Watt University since 1992.

Career
From 2001 to 2008, she was a columnist for The Observer. She has also contributed to the Daily Mail and the New Statesman. Earlier in her career she was deputy editor of the Today newspaper, and women's and assistant editor of the Daily Mirror.

Riddell is a member of the advisory board of Out of Trouble, which is affiliated with the Prison Reform Trust.

Personal life
Her mother (Emmeline Mary) Carmella, who died in Boston in 2006 aged 86, received the MBE in the 1988 New Year Honours for charity work in Boston for Bangladesh.

References

External links
 Twitter
 Guardian and Observer contributor page
 New Statesman contributor page
 Daily Telegraph contributor page

1952 births
Living people
Alumni of the University of Nottingham
The Daily Telegraph people
English women journalists
People from Boston, Lincolnshire
People from Grimsby
The Observer people